William Heartz Brown (February 25, 1883 – May 24, 1967) was a Canadian politician. He represented the electoral district of Yarmouth in the Nova Scotia House of Assembly from 1949 to 1956. He was a member of the Progressive Conservative Party of Nova Scotia.

Brown was born in 1883 at Yarmouth, Nova Scotia. He married Etta May, and was employed as a superintendent at a textile plant. He served on town council in Yarmouth from 1948 to 1952. Brown entered provincial politics in the 1949 election, winning the dual-member Yarmouth riding with Liberal Donald J. Fraser. He was re-elected in the 1953 election, serving with Progressive Conservative Raymond Z. Bourque. Both Brown and Bourque were defeated when they ran for re-election in 1956, losing to Liberals Willard O'Brien and Eric Spinney. Brown died at Yarmouth on May 24, 1967.

References

1883 births
1967 deaths
Progressive Conservative Association of Nova Scotia MLAs
People from Yarmouth, Nova Scotia
Nova Scotia municipal councillors